Jumirim is a municipality in the state of São Paulo in Brazil. It is part of the Metropolitan Region of Sorocaba. The population is 3,418 (2020 est.) in an area of 56.69 km². The elevation is 561 m.

References

Municipalities in São Paulo (state)